Malam Jabba (also Maalam Jabba, Urdu: مالم جبہ) is a Hill Station and ski resort in the Hindu Kush mountain range nearly 40 km from Saidu Sharif in Swat Valley, Khyber Pakhtunkhwa Province of Pakistan. It is 314 km from Islamabad and 51 km from Saidu Sharif Airport.

Description

Malam Jabba is home to one of the two ski resorts in Pakistan; the other is at Naltar, Gilgit Baltistan. On the main Madyan-Kalam road, the road turns to the right at Manglor town (12 km from Saidu Sahrif), for the Malam-Jabba Dara which has a series of small villages and settlements like Salanda, Jehanabad, Talegraam, Badar, Ser, Malam, Kishora, Spine Oba, and finally Jabba. Malam is a small village which comes prior to Kishora village on the main Malam-Jabba road. Malam is nearly 17 km from Manglor while Kishora is at 18 km distance. Jabba (12 km from Kishora) is the upper most part of the whole Dara (gorge). The Malam Jabba Ski Resort, owned by the Pakistan Tourism Development Corporation, had a ski slope of about 800m with the highest point of the slope 2804 m (9200 ft) above sea level. Malam Jabba Ski Resort was the joint effort of the Pakistan with its Austrian counterpart. The resort was equipped with modern facilities including roller/ice-skating rinks, chair lifts, skiing platforms, telephones and snow clearing equipment. There was a wooden motel which had been built to house the construction workers of the ski slope and then opened to the public.

2008 Taliban attack 
The resort was destroyed by Taliban militants in June 2008 during the War in North-West Pakistan when they held Swat Valley. A large portion of the resort was reduced to ashes, including the hotel, several houses and the chairlift.

2016 reconstruction and reopening 
After government restored control in the area, the Government of Khyber Pakhtunkhwa awarded the rebuilding to a private company, which restored the hotel, the ski resort and other facilities. A five star hotel with 76 rooms was opened by Pearl-Continental Hotels & Resorts in 2020. A new 800 meter long ski chairlift was inaugurated in September 2016.

See also
Miandam
Naltar ski resort
Saidu Sharif
Swat Valley

References

External links

Tourist attractions in Swat
Tourism in Khyber Pakhtunkhwa
Hill stations in Pakistan
Ski areas and resorts in Pakistan